Journal of Geosciences (1956-1992 Časopis pro mineralogii a geologii, 1993-2006: Journal of the Czech Geological Society) is a peer-reviewed scientific journal published by the Czech Geological Society and its predecessors since 1956. The journal covers research in the fields of igneous and metamorphic petrology, geochemistry, and mineralogy.

Abstracting and indexing
The journal is abstracted and indexed in:
 Science Citation Index Expanded
 Current Contents/Physical, Chemical & Earth Sciences
 Scopus
 GeoRef
In addition, it is part of the Geoscience e-Journals collection. According to the Journal Citation Reports, the journal has a 2011 impact factor of 1.279.

References

External links 
 

English-language journals
Geology journals
Open access journals
Quarterly journals
Publications established in 1956
Academic journals published by learned and professional societies